M. Basil Pennington O.C.S.O. (1931–2005) was an American Roman Catholic Trappist monk and priest. He was a leading spiritual writer, speaker, teacher, and director.

Pennington was an alumnus of the Pontifical University of St. Thomas Aquinas Angelicum where he obtained a licentiate in Theology in 1959. He also earned a licentiate in Canon Law at the Pontifical Gregorian University. Pennington became known internationally as one of the major proponents of the Centering Prayer movement begun at St. Joseph's Abbey in Spencer, Massachusetts, during the 1970s.

Pennington's book Centering Prayer was first published in 1980, and had sold more than a million copies by 2002. Translations of this work have been published in Spanish, French, Polish, Portuguese, and Italian.

Life

Pennington entered the Order of Cistercians of the Strict Observance at St. Joseph's Abbey in June 1951. At St. Joseph's Abbey, he was appointed professor of theology in 1959, professor of canon law and professor of spirituality in 1963, and vocation director in 1978. In 2000, he was appointed superior at Assumption Abbey in Ava, Missouri, and later that same year he was elected abbot of the Monastery of the Holy Spirit in Conyers, Georgia. He returned to St. Joseph's Abbey after retiring in 2002. He died on June 3, 2005, the Feast of the Sacred Heart of Jesus, from injuries sustained from a car accident.

Bernard McGinn wrote that Pennington "not only wrote effectively about centering prayer, but he also traveled across the United States and the world spreading the practice through lectures and workshops. The renewal of contemplative prayer in the last decades of the twentieth century owes much to these efforts."

In Pennington's obituary, McGinn stated that "For those who never met Basil Pennington, reading the published form of the journal he kept during [a visit to Mount Athos] will provide a good sense of the man in all his humanity and irrepressible goodwill."

Bibliography

Pennington published over 60 books, including:

 (222 pages)
1982 edition by Image (Garden City, NY):  (254 pages)
1989 edition by St. Paul Publications:  (222 pages)
1998 edition by St. Pauls:  (219 pages)
2001 edition by Doubleday (New York, NY):  (260 pages)
"Monastic Journey to India" (1982, 1999)
"Monastery: Prayer, Work, Community" (1983)
"Called: New Thinking on Christian Vocation" (1983)
"Daily We Follow Him: Learning Discipleship from Peter" (1987)
"Mary Today" (1987)
"Living Our Priesthood Today" (1987)
"Prayertimes" (1987)
"Through the Year with the Saints" (1988)
"Monastic Life" (1989)
"The Monastic Way" (1990)
"The Fifteen Mysteries: In Image and Word" (1993)
"Praying by Hand: Rediscovering the Rosary As a Way of Prayer" (1995)
"Awake In The Spirit" (1995)
"Daily We Touch Him" (1997)
"A Place Apart: Monastic Prayer and Practice for Everyone" (1998)
"Lectio Divina" (1998)
"Centering Prayer in Daily Life and Ministry" (1998)
"Centered Living: The Way of Centering Prayer" (1999)
"Living in the Question: Meditations in the Style of Lectio Divina" (1999)
"True Self/False Self: Unmasking the Spirit Within" (2000)
"Eucharist: Wine of Faith, Bread of Life" (2000)
"Listening: God's Word for Today" (2000)
"The Bread of God: Nurturing a Eucharistic Imagination" (2001)
"A School of Love: The Cistercian Way to Holiness" (2001)
"The Abbey Prayer Book" (2002)
"20 Mysteries of the Rosary: A Scriptural Journey" (2003)
"Call to the Center, Revised: Gospel's Invitation to Deeper Prayer" (2003)
"Who Do You Say I Am?: Meditations on Jesus' Questions in the Gospels" (2005)

References

External links

American Roman Catholic religious writers
Catholic spirituality
Trappists
1931 births
2005 deaths
20th-century American Roman Catholic priests